Terry Scanlon was an Australian comedian.

Terry Scanlon may also refer to:

Terry Scanlon, coach in Victorian Amateur Football Association
Terry Scanlon, character in The Green Death
Terry Scanlon, musician on Flex Your Head